Munster (Lorraine Franconian: Minschder) is a commune in the Moselle department in Grand Est in north-eastern France.

Demographics

Architecture

Notable buildings include the 13th-century Saint Nicholas Collegiate Roman Catholic church (collégiale Saint-Nicolas). Some of the church's features were replicated in the Cathedral Basilica of the Immaculate Conception in Denver, Colorado.

See also
 Communes of the Moselle department
 Parc naturel régional de Lorraine

References

External links
 

Communes of Moselle (department)